Lao National Day is held in Laos on December 2. The public holiday marks the end of the monarchy and the establishment of the Lao People's Democratic Republic in 1975.

References

Laotian culture
National days